Rubens Augusto de Souza Espínola (8 June 1928 – 28 December 2017) was a Brazilian Roman Catholic bishop.

De Souza Espínola was ordained to the priesthood in 1963. He served as auxiliary bishop of the Roman Catholic Diocese of São San Luìs de Montes Belos, Brazil from 1980 to 1985. He then served as Bishop of the Diocese of Paranavaí from 1985 to 2003.

Notes

1928 births
2017 deaths
20th-century Roman Catholic bishops in Brazil
21st-century Roman Catholic bishops in Brazil
Roman Catholic bishops of Paranavaí
Roman Catholic bishops of São Luís de Montes Belos